Bergamodactylus is a putative genus of basal pterosaur which lived during the Late Triassic (early Norian) in the area of present-day Bergamo province in Italy. Its only species is Bergamodactylus wildi. It was named in 2015 based on a pterosaur specimen which had previously been regarded as a juvenile Eudimorphodon or as identical to Carniadactylus. Some Triassic pterosaur specialists consider the distinguishing features of Bergamodactylus to be invalid or insufficient to distinguish it from Carniadactylus, and thus retain the specimen in that genus.

History 

In 1978, Rupert Wild described a small pterosaur specimen in the collection of the Museo di Paleontologia dell´Università di Milano, found near Cene, Lombardy. He referred to it as the "Milan Exemplar" and identified it as a juvenile of Eudimorphodon ranzii. Wild noted considerable differences with the latter's type specimen but these were explained as reflecting the young age of the animal.

In 2009, Fabio Marco Dalla Vecchia confirmed an earlier conclusion by Alexander Kellner that the specimen must have been at least subadult in view of the fusion of the scapula and the coracoid, the upper wristbones being fused into a syncarpal, and the fusion of the extensor process on the first wing phalanx. Dalla Vecchia referred the specimen to Carniadactylus rosenfeldi.

In 2015, Kellner concluded that the Milan Exemplar represented a different species from Carniadactylus. It showed differences in build that could not be explained by individual variation, it was much smaller though of similar age, and it was of a younger geological age. He named a separate genus and species Bergamodactylus wildi. The generic name combines a reference to Bergamo with a Greek δάκτυλος, daktylos, "finger", a usual suffix in pterosaur names since Pterodactylus. The specific name honours Wild.Kellner placed Bergamodactylus, within the Novialoidea, in the Campylognathoidea.

In 2018, Dalla Vecchia argued that Kellner's observations on development in pterosaurs were oversimplified, and that the Milan Exemplar's distinguishing features were ambiguous, invalid, or individual variation at best. As a result, Dalla Vecchia referred the specimen back to Carniadactylus, rendering Bergamodactylus wildi a junior synonym of Carniadactylus rosenfeldi.

Description 

The holotype, MPUM 6009, was found in a layer of the Calcari di Zorzino Formation dating from the early Norian (upper Alaunian). It consists of a partial skeleton including the skull, compressed on a single plate. It is largely articulated and includes the lower jaws, most of the wings, much of the vertebral column except the tail, and hindlimb elements. Some bones have only been preserved as impressions.

Bergamodactylus is one of the smallest known pterosaurs: Kellner in 2015 estimated the wingspan at just 465 millimetres. He also established some distinguishing traits. The postorbital bone is slender with a thin branch towards the frontal bone. The praemaxilla does not reach the lower rim of the external nostril. The fourth metacarpal is short, with only 40% of the length of the humerus and 30% of the length of the ulna. The thighbone is short, attaining just half of the length of either the ulna or the first wing finger phalanx.

Bergamodactylus has multi-cusped teeth like Eudimorphodon but their number strongly differs: fourteen in both the upper jaw and the lower jaw as against respectively twenty-nine and twenty-eight in the latter species. Additional differences with Carniadactylus include a tooth row that extends further to the rear, a lower mandibula, a higher placed deltopectoral crest on the humerus and a shorter upper part of the kinked pteroid. Bergamodactylus has a short second phalanx of the wing finger in common with Carniadactylus.

See also
List of pterosaur genera

References

Late Triassic pterosaurs of Europe
Fossil taxa described in 2015
Taxa named by Alexander Kellner
Novialoids
Fossils of Italy